Usgentia quadridentale is a species of moth in the family Crambidae. It is found in Kyrgyzstan.

References

Moths described in 1914
Odontiinae